Point de Paris is a French bobbin lace of the 18th century, with slender trailing designs in a point de Paris ground. It was a simple lace, and did not compete with those of Flanders. It was revived in the late 19th century for trimming lingerie and 'fancy linen'.

Point de Paris ground is used in other lace styles as well. It has many other names:
 six-point star - from the shape
 fond chant - it formed the ground of 19th-century Chantilly lace)
 fond double
 Kat stitch - there was a tradition that Catherine of Aragorn started the tradition of Bedfordshire lace
 French ground - it was used in 18th century French peasant lace
 wire ground - the intertwining of the threads looks like a wire mesh

It is also found in Antwerp lace, Chantilly lace  and Bucks Point.

References

Bobbin lace